BattleTech Centers are commercial virtual entertainment venues that feature multiplayer virtual combat in the fictional BattleTech universe.  The games are played in fully enclosed cockpits with multiple screens, joysticks, and rudder pedals. The centers were initially created and operated by Tim Disney's Virtual World Entertainment, Inc.  Today, the gaming cockpits can now be found in various sites around the United States.

History
The first BattleTech Center opened in Chicago in 1990, with others in Yokohama following in August 1992 and Tokyo in 1993. Eventually, 26 such facilities were built and included other game types and more elaborate operations. These new locations were called 'Virtual World'. Each Virtual World site featured at least 16 networked "pods" designed in part by Frog Design. In 1991, Computer and Video Games called Battletech "definitely the most exciting interactive videogame system yet devised." It was also featured in Discovery Channel's Beyond 2000.

By 1993, patrons could compete against players in other centers across the country. Red Planet was the first non-BattleTech game added, and involved racing through the mining tunnels of Mars using vectored thrust mining hover-crafts.  However, rapid advances in arcade games and online games meant that the Japanese Centers began closing in 1995, and by 2000 no BattleTech Centers remained operational in Japan.

In 1996, Virtual World Entertainment, INC and FASA Interactive Technologies merged and became wholly owned subsidiaries of Virtual World Entertainment Group (VWEG).  In 1999, Microsoft Corporation purchased VWEG, sold VWE to a group headed by VWEG's former CFO, James Garbarini, and integrated FASA Interactive into the Microsoft Game Studios division.  In 2005, all interest in VWE was sold to Nickolas 'PropWash' Smith and the principal offices were moved from Chicago to Kalamazoo, MI.   

In November 2005, an operator of the Virtual World Tesla II cockpits, MechCorps Entertainment, LLC, in Houston, Texas, USA opened to the public with eight Tesla II pods. They acquired another four pods in 2007, and hosted the 2007 National BattleTech Invitational in September 2007 with all 12 pods operational.

MechJock LLC, MechCorps Entertainment LLC, and VGCorps decided to refit existing Tesla II pods and take the BattleTech Center experience on the road in 2008. Gaming, sci-fi and anime conventions (including Comicpalooza, Oni-Con, MechaCon and Dragon Con) in the southern U.S. were introduced to MechCorps' Mobile Armor Division while Virtual World Entertainment in association with MechJock LLC made appearances in the Mid-West at events including Gencon, Origins, ACEN and Youmacon.

In 2006, hardcore players in Japan purchased four Tesla pods from the U.S., and began to put together a Virtual World Center in Tokyo. Despite many key components becoming 'Lostech' and their spare parts no longer available in market, the pods are now semi-operational, though no commercial operation has resumed yet.

In June 2012, Mr. Biggs Family Fun Center closed and all assets were auctioned off. This included 12 Pods. 
Mr. Biggs (formerly Fat City) megaplex in Littleton, Colorado contracted with an individual that owned 12 Pods.  Mr. Biggs sold the Megaplex and general operations to another business entity. The owner of the pods removed his assets and put them into storage. The 12 pods were publicly auctioned on e-Bay. Cite: https://pinside.com/pinball/community/pinsiders/tesla-ii/stories/battletech-firestorm-tesla-ii-pods-for-sale-set-of-12  

In 2011, The Airlock in Kirkland, WA closed. Eight Tesla Simulators were transferred. The WA Secretary of State show the company as Better Than Life, LLC  UBI 602957500 Status is currently "Inactive". The pods were used under agreement by the two Governor of the LLC.  

Around 2011 there were 8 pods listed on Facebook at two private home-based arcades. The trend indicates that public Battletech sites are diminishing.

In 2017, Virtual World Entertainment, LLC. re-launched its website at www.mechjock.com indicating that cockpit development continues and updated software featuring 5.07d can be played in Houston, Grand Rapids, and Minneapolis.

In August 2018, BattleTech center and game store Big Kidz Games in Grand Rapids, MI permanently closed.  The Podtracker lists these pods as being private and in control of the owner of the store.

The Fallout Shelter Arcade closed its Taft St. location in February 2020, but continues to schedule convention attendances for the future. 

MechCorps Entertainment LLC moved its Houston, TX, headquarters in July 2020 and remains open to the public while observing recommended COVID precautions. Convention attendances are intended to resume as conventions reopen.

List of BattleTech centers

There are more cockpits in private hands not included in this list.
Aug 2020 - Craig “Pharaoh” Evans in Denver Metro Area:  YouTube Channel Tesla II cockpit ownership purchased from Hinkleys Family Center. https://www.youtube.com/channel/UCa4IQGzI2E6v7fn9GnVkaTA

Reviews
White Wolf #23 (Oct./Nov., 1990) - Chicago BattleTech Center

References

External links
  Virtual World Entertainment Home Page
 MechCorps Entertainment LLC
 BattleTech Pod Convention Attendances

1990 video games
Arcade video games
BattleTech games
Military combat simulators
Virtual reality